A guest ranch, also known as a dude ranch, is a type of ranch oriented towards visitors or tourism. It is considered a form of agritourism.

History
Guest ranches arose in response to the romanticization of the American West that began to occur in the late 19th century. In 1893, historian Frederick Jackson Turner stated that the United States frontier was demographically "closed". This in turn led many people to have feelings of nostalgia for bygone days, but also, given that the risks of a true frontier were gone, allowed for nostalgia to be indulged in relative safety. Thus, the person referred to as a "tenderfoot" or a "greenhorn" by westerners was finally able to visit and enjoy the advantages of western life for a short period of time without needing to risk life and limb.

The dude ranch probably originated in the Dakotas in the mid-1880s, the first recorded ranch was near Medora, North Dakota in 1884 owned by the Eaton brothers, businessmen from Pittsburgh. It was likely fostered by the collapse of the free-range cattle industry in the late 1880s. Too many ranchers shared the open plains with vast herds of cattle, and in the hard winter of 1886 herds were decimated, with some owners financially ruined overnight.

The Western adventures of famous figures, like Theodore Roosevelt, a neighbor of the Eatons in the 1880s, were made available to paying guests from cities of the East, called "dudes" in the West. In the early years, the transcontinental railroad network brought paying visitors to a local depot, where a wagon or buggy would be waiting to transport people to a ranch. Experiences varied as some guest ranch visitors expected a somewhat edited and more luxurious version of the "cowboy life", while others were more tolerant of the odors and timetable of a working ranch. By 1913 it was noted that ranchers had begun to dress as 'cowboys' and introduce pageantry such as an afternoon cattle round-up, to add to the expected 'glamour' of western life.

While there were guest ranches prior to the 20th century, the trend grew considerably after the end of World War I. In the early 1920s guest ranching became popular in Texas. As one rancher near Bandera, Texas, noted: "you can run more dudes to the acre in these hills than you can cattle". Dude wrangling was profitable, and vacationers were easier to handle than stock, although some wranglers considered dudes ornerier than livestock. Competition with ever larger and more professional cattle operations around this time possibly also contributed to this trend. In 1923 a dude ranch opened in Hawaii, modeled after those in Wyoming. In 1926, the Dude Ranchers Association was founded in Billings, Montana, to represent the needs of this rapidly growing industry. Advertisements during this era were often aimed at the upper class and stressed the beauty of the natural scenery, the healthiness of being outdoors, and the wildlife. Recently established national parks in the area were also an added tourist attraction. During the Great Depression the industry continued to expand, likely as an alternative income source as real cattle ranches were experiencing financial troubles. In the 1930s dude ranches proliferated along with the Rocky Mountains and around Palm Springs in California, while becoming rarer in Texas. Many of these areas were inhospitable for cattle, and stock and fodder had to be imported during the dude season.

In 1935 the industry boomed, and Western railroad companies advertised destinations to paying guests. Airlines and travel bureaus also began to enter the business in this period. The University of Wyoming began to offer a degree in recreational ranching, and one could take a four-year course in dude wrangling. Most of the patrons hailed from New York at this time. As the trips became more popular and less affluent people began to become interested, there was an economic incentive to establish lower-cost dude ranches in the East, including in New York State. In 1943 the Eastern Dude Ranchers' Association was formed. Throughout the 1940s business remained good, as wars throughout the rest of the world made foreign travel less attractive.

In the 1950s the growth leveled off, with the number of registered dude ranches in 1958 dropping off to 100 "bona fide" ranches. Especially in Arizona and California, the industry became more professional, with dude ranches becoming more like country clubs with elegant rooms and diverse recreational amenities such as tennis courts, golf, and heated swimming pools, catering to some 200 guests at a time by the 1960s. Agriculture was no longer practiced, and many ranches no longer held any cattle. Establishments with horses for guests needed to import fodder. In turn, other ventures began to turn away from the term, advertising themselves as not a luxury resort or a dude ranch, but a working ranch with guest rooms -this trend was already evident in the 1930s, but by the 1950s the term began to become unpopular, with most establishments advertising themselves as simply 'ranches', and stressing their bona fides as real farms. Common to most of these establishments were free use of horses, while normal resorts charged customers extra for a horse ride. Guests would often ride into the surrounding hills for a camping trip. Some guests preferred to do ranch chores, and this was sometimes advertised, with such guests being advised to visit in the autumn when there were more chores. Eastern ranches often lacked cattle, but in order to maintain a Western atmosphere one New York ranch bought a bison from a zoo, and another had an entire Western town built, complete with a saloon, board sidewalks, and a dirt street. Of course, the main attraction for most tourists was the myth and adventure of the Wild West.

Western ranches were likely less discriminatory, with very few ranches billing themselves as "restricted", but in the Eastern industry, this practice was common in the 1930s.

In the US, guest ranches are now a long-established tradition and continue to be a vacation destination. Depending on the climate, some guest ranches are open only in the summer or winter, while others offer year-round service. Some of the activities offered at many guest ranches include horseback riding, target shooting, cattle sorting, hayrides, campfire sing-alongs, hiking, camping, whitewater rafting, zip-lining, archery and fishing. College students are often recruited to work at guest ranches during the summer months. Common jobs offered to college students include housekeeping, wrangler, dining staff, and office staff or babysitters. A number of working ranches have survived lean financial times by taking in paying guests for part of the year.

Hunting ranches
Some guest ranches cater to hunters. Some feature native wildlife such as whitetail deer, mule deer, bison or elk.  Others feature exotic species imported from other regions and nations such as Africa and India. While many traditional ranches allow hunters and outfitters on their land to hunt native game, the act of confining game to guarantee a kill as practiced on some ranches is controversial and considered unsporting (see fair chase).

The introduction of non-native species on ranches is more controversial because of concerns that these "exotics" may escape and become feral, modify the natural environment, or spread previously unknown diseases. Advocates of hunting ranches argue in turn that they help protect native herds from over-hunting, provide important income for locals and nature conservation, and that the stocking of exotic species actually increases their numbers and may help save them from extinction.

See also
Farm stay
Outfitter

References

External links
 Dude Ranchers Association Records, 1926-1971 (University of Montana Archives)
 Montana Dude Ranches Oral History Collection (University of Montana Archives)
 Eastward Ho! The Dude Ranch 1925–1955 from American Studies at the University of Virginia

Dude ranches
Tourist attractions in the United States
History of the American West